Shocking is a cooking process wherein the food substance, usually a vegetable or fruit, is plunged into iced water or placed under cold running water to halt the cooking process.

See also 

 Blanching
 Parboiling

References

Cooking techniques
Culinary terminology